Amy H. Handlin (born January 28, 1956) is an American Republican Party politician who served in the New Jersey General Assembly, where she represented the 13th Legislative District from 2006 to 2020.

Education and career 
Handlin earned a B.A. in 1977 from Harvard University, a MBA from Columbia University in 1979, and a Ph.D. in Marketing from New York University in 1991. She was an associate professor of marketing at Monmouth University until her retirement in 2019 and was also a senior fellow at the Center for the Study of Public Issues.

Monmouth County Politics 
Handlin was elected to the Monmouth County Board of Chosen Freeholders in 1989 and re-elected in 1992, 1995, 1998, 2001 and 2004. Previously, she served as deputy mayor and township committeewoman in Middletown Township. Handlin is a former commissioner on the New Jersey State Commission on Higher Education and chair of Monmouth County's Communities Against Tobacco Coalition. Named 2003 Elected Official of the Year by the Northern Monmouth Chamber of Commerce, she has also been honored by the American Cancer Society of New Jersey, Prevention First, 180:Turning Lives Around and many other public health organizations for her work to reduce teen smoking. Handlin has also served on the boards of the New Jersey League of Women Voters and the American Association of University Women, among others. She is a past recipient of the Legislative Award of the New Jersey Environmental Federation, the Humanitarian Award of Brandeis University Women, the Rose and Scroll Award of the New Jersey Association of Women Business Owners, and numerous other citations for civic leadership. Handlin, the author of the 1998 book Whatever Happened to the Year of the Woman? Why Women Still Aren't Making It to the Top in Politics, and the books Be Your Own Lobbyist, (Praeger, 2010) and Government Grief (Praeger 2011). She has also been a columnist for the New Jersey Reporter, a public-affairs magazine. A founding member and former chair of the Monmouth County Advisory Commission on Women, Handlin is a member of the national board of the Jewish Council for Public Affairs and vice president of community relations for the Jewish Federation of Greater Monmouth County. A past chair of the Central Jersey Israel EXPO, she has also co-chaired the United Jewish Communities' Northeast Leadership Conference.

New Jersey Assembly 
Handlin ran against fellow Republican Joseph Azzolina whom she defeated in the June 2005 GOP primary. Handlin was one of the main proponents of the ban enacted in 2007 on consumption of alcohol in the PNC Bank Arts Center parking lots. After incumbent 13th District Senator Joe Kyrillos announced he would not seek re-election in 2017, Handlin initially intended to run for his seat, putting her into a contested primary with fellow Assembly member Declan O'Scanlon. However, Handlin ultimately dropped her Senate bid, and instead ran for re-election to her Assembly seat, which she retained in the general election.

For the 2019 general election, Handlin announced she would not run for another term and was retiring from the Assembly. Her current term concluded in 2020 and she was succeeded by Republican Gerard Scharfenberger.

Committees 
Higher Education
Regulated Professions

Personal life 
Handlin resides in Middletown Township, where she lives with husband David, son Daniel and daughter Rebecca.

Electoral history

Assembly

References

External links
Assemblywoman Handlin's legislative web page, New Jersey Legislature
New Jersey Legislature financial disclosure forms – 2016 2015 2014 2013 2012 2011 2010 2009 2008 2007 2006 2005
Monmouth County Freeholder biography
Assembly Member Amy H. Handlin, Project Vote Smart

1956 births
Living people
Columbia Business School alumni
Harvard Business School alumni
Monmouth University faculty
Democratic Party members of the New Jersey General Assembly
New Jersey city council members
County commissioners in New Jersey
New York University alumni
People from Middletown Township, New Jersey
Women state legislators in New Jersey
Women city councillors in New Jersey
21st-century American politicians
21st-century American women politicians
American women academics